Chao Jou (born 23 March 1995) is a Taiwanese karateka. She won one of the bronze medals in the women's kumite 68 kg event at the 2014 Asian Games held in Incheon, South Korea. In 2018, she lost her bronze medal match against Kayo Someya of Japan in that event at the Asian Games held in Jakarta, Indonesia.

She won the silver medal in the women's team kumite event at the 2016 World University Karate Championships held in Braga, Portugal.

At the 2019 Asian Karate Championships held in Tashkent, Uzbekistan, she won one of the bronze medals in the women's kumite 68 kg event. In 2021, she competed in the women's 68 kg event at the 2021 World Karate Championships held in Dubai, United Arab Emirates.

Achievements

References 

Living people
1995 births
Place of birth missing (living people)
Taiwanese female karateka
Karateka at the 2014 Asian Games
Karateka at the 2018 Asian Games
Medalists at the 2014 Asian Games
Asian Games medalists in karate
Asian Games bronze medalists for Chinese Taipei
21st-century Taiwanese women